Senator Cason may refer to:

Thomas J. Cason (1828–1901), Indiana State Senate
William J. Cason (1924–2017), Missouri State Senate